Sir Clarence Waldemar "Clarrie" Harders  (1 March 191522 February 1997) was a senior Australian public servant best known for his time as Secretary of the Attorney-General's Department in the 1970s.

Life and career
Clarrie Harders was born on 1 March 1915.

He was appointed Secretary of the Attorney-General's Department on 29 June 1970.

In 1979, Harders retired from his position as Secretary of the Attorney-General's department and was appointed legal adviser to the Department of Foreign Affairs.

After leaving the Australian Public Service, Harders went on to become a consultant with a major law firm.

Harders died on 22 February 1997.

Awards
Harders was made an Officer of the Order of the British Empire in 1969, whilst Deputy Secretary of the Attorney-General's Department. He was knighted in recognition of his public service in June 1977.

References

1915 births
1997 deaths
Australian public servants
Australian Officers of the Order of the British Empire
Australian Knights Bachelor